Palenque International Airport  is an international airport located in Palenque, Chiapas, Mexico. It handles national and international air traffic for the city of Palenque. It is operated by Grupo Aeroportuario de Chiapas, a government-owned corporation.

As of Oct 2022,I am unable to find any Mexico city to Palenque flights offered.? 

The airport was officially inaugurated on March 13, 2014. On that date, Interjet started bi-weekly service to Mexico City; as a result, traffic increased to 18,148 passengers in 2015.

On 16 December 2016, the Secretariat of Communications and Transportation declared that Palenque met the infrastructure, facilities, equipment and service requirements to be authorised as an international civil airfield.

In 2020, Interjet filed for bankruptcy as a result of the COVID-19 pandemic, effectively terminating the airport’s only regular passenger service. As of January 2022, no Mexican airline offers direct flights from Mexico City. 

It handled 6,399 passengers in 2020, and 1,602 passengers in 2021.

Airlines and destinations

Statistics

Passengers

See also 

 List of the busiest airports in Mexico

References

External links
 Palenque Intl. Airport

Airports in Chiapas